Aetos Orfano Football Club is a Greek football club, based in Ofrynio, Kavala, Greece.

Honours

Domestic

 Kavala FCA Champions: 1
 2016–17
 Kavala FCA Cup Winners: 1
 2013–14

References

Football clubs in Eastern Macedonia and Thrace
Kavala
Association football clubs established in 1979
1979 establishments in Greece
Gamma Ethniki clubs